Música de Rua (Portuguese for "Street Music") is the third album by the Brazilian axé and MPB singer Daniela Mercury, released in 1994 through Sony Music.

Música de Rua was released right after the massive success of Mercury's previous album, O Canto da Cidade (1992). It was very well received by the public, having sold over one million copies (achieving a diamond certification) and spreading two number-one singles ("Música de Rua" e "O Reggae e o Mar"). However, Música de Rua was not very well received by the critics who pointed out that the album sounded too similar to Mercury's previous and accused it of being a copycat of her own work. Música de Rua was Mercury's most authorial work until the release of Canibália in 2009. Camille Paglia called "Rap Repente" "'absolutely thrilling ... It's like a mini-opera!'"

Track listing

Release history

References

External links
About the album in Mercury's official website

1994 albums
Daniela Mercury albums
Albums produced by Liminha